George W. Chapman was an American lawyer and politician from New York.

Life
George Walton Chapman was born 19 Aug 1832 in Saratoga County, New York and lived in Ballston Spa, New York where he died 20 Apr 1881. He attended the University of Rochester where he is listed on the Delta Psi fraternity rolls for 1854. In 1860 he published a small volume of poetry that is most notable for a lengthy tribute to the famed arctic physician-explorer Elisha Kent Kane. The poem, which is composed of rhyming couplets in iambic pentameter,  runs from pages 1 to 31 of his book and terminates in a two-page "Notes" section which explicates some of the references in the poem. Before and after the discovery of his fate, many lyric poems were penned in memory of Sir John Franklin, (such as Joseph Addison Turner's 1858 "The Discovery of Sir John Franklin"). There was however little poetic literature published on America's arctic hero - Elisha Kent Kane. His premature death from rheumatic heart disease in 1857 at age 37 was unexpected and stunned the nation. Eulogies, orations and short verses were delivered during the obsequies held in his honor, but Chapman's "Tribute" is the only lengthy, 19th-century poetical piece published in hardcover. This slender volume, published when its author was but 26 years-old, was Chapman's only work of poetry. In 1862, he was Supervisor of the Town of Milton. He was a member of the New York State Assembly (Saratoga Co., 1st D.) in 1865.

In 1869, Chapman was appointed by Governor John Thompson Hoffman a Canal Commissioner, to fill the vacancy caused by the death of Oliver Bascom. At the New York state election, 1870, he was elected, on the Democratic ticket, to succeed himself for the remainder of Bascom's term, and remained in office until the end of 1871. At the New York state election, 1871, he was defeated running for re-election. He is buried in Ballston Spa Village Cemetery, Ballston Spa, Saratoga County, New York.

References

Sources
The New York Civil List compiled by Franklin Benjamin Hough, Stephen C. Hutchins and Edgar Albert Werner (1867; pages 502 and 509)
 Political Graveyard
 The state tickets, in NYT on October 30, 1870
Catalogue of the Delta Psi Fraternity, New York: Privately Published, 1889;
US Federal Census for 1870, George W. Chapman, Milton, Saratoga, New York
Sawin, Mark W., Raising Kane: Elisha Kent Kane and the Culture of Fame in Antebellum America, Philadelphia: American Philosophical Society, 2008

Year of birth missing
Year of death missing
People from Ballston Spa, New York
Erie Canal Commissioners
Members of the New York State Assembly
People from Milton, Saratoga County, New York